The 2015 French Open was a tennis tournament played on outdoor clay courts. It was the 119th edition of the French Open and the second Grand Slam event of the year. It took place at the Stade Roland Garros from 24 May to 7 June and consisted of events for professional players in singles, doubles and mixed doubles play. Junior and wheelchair players also took part in singles and doubles events.

Rafael Nadal was the five-time defending champion in the Men's Singles, but lost to Novak Djokovic in the quarter finals. Stan Wawrinka won his first French Open title, defeating Djokovic in the final. Maria Sharapova was defending the Women's Singles title, but lost to Lucie Šafářová in the fourth round. Serena Williams defeated Šafářová in the final and won her third French Open title, 20th Grand Slam singles title, and third Career Grand Slam.

Tournament

The 2015 French Open was the 114th edition of the French Open and was held at Stade Roland Garros in Paris.

The tournament is an event run by the International Tennis Federation (ITF) and is part of the 2015 ATP World Tour and the 2015 WTA Tour calendars under the Grand Slam category. The tournament consists of both men's and women's singles and doubles draws as well as a mixed doubles event.

There is a singles and doubles events for both boys and girls (players under 18), which is part of the Grade A category of tournaments, and singles and doubles events for men's and women's wheelchair tennis players as part of the UNIQLO tour under the Grand Slam category. The tournament was played on clay courts and took place over a series of 22 courts, including the three main showcourts, Court Philippe Chatrier, Court Suzanne Lenglen and Court 1.

Points and prize money

Points distribution
Below is a series of tables for each of the competitions showing the ranking points on offer for each event.

Senior points

Wheelchair points

Junior points

Prize money
The total prize money for the tournament was €28,028,600, an increase of €3 million compared to the previous edition. The winners of the men's and women's singles title receive €1,800,000, an increase of 9% compared to 2014.

* per team

Singles players
Men's singles

Women's singles

Day-by-day summaries

Singles seeds
The following are the seeded players and notable players who withdrew from the event. Seedings are based on ATP and WTA rankings as of 18 May 2015.  Rank and points before are as of 25 May 2015.

Men's singles

† The player did not qualify for the tournament in 2014.  Accordingly, points for his 18th best result are deducted instead.

Withdrawn players

Women's singles

Doubles seeds

Men's doubles

 1 Rankings were as of 18 May 2015.

Women's doubles

 1 Rankings were as of 18 May 2015.

Mixed doubles

 1 Rankings were as of 18 May 2015.

Main draw wildcard entries
The following players were given wildcards to the main draw based on internal selection and recent performances.

Men's singles
  Maxime Hamou
  Quentin Halys
  Thanasi Kokkinakis
  Paul-Henri Mathieu
  Nicolas Mahut
  Lucas Pouille
  Édouard Roger-Vasselin
  Frances Tiafoe

Women's singles
  Manon Arcangioli
  Louisa Chirico
  Océane Dodin
  Fiona Ferro
  Amandine Hesse
  Mathilde Johansson
  Alizé Lim
  Virginie Razzano

Men's doubles
  Enzo Couacaud /  Quentin Halys
  Kenny de Schepper /  Benoît Paire
  Thanasi Kokkinakis /  Lucas Pouille
  Tristan Lamasine /  Johan Tatlot
  Axel Michon /  Gianni Mina
  Gaël Monfils /  Josselin Ouanna
  Florent Serra /  Maxime Teixeira

Women's doubles
  Manon Arcangioli /  Chloé Paquet
  Julie Coin /  Pauline Parmentier
  Clothilde de Bernardi /  Sherazad Reix
  Stéphanie Foretz /  Amandine Hesse
  Mathilde Johansson /  Virginie Razzano
  Alizé Lim /  Laura Thorpe
  Irina Ramialison /  Constance Sibille

Mixed doubles
  Julie Coin /  Nicolas Mahut
  Clothilde de Bernardi /  Maxime Hamou
  Stéphanie Foretz /  Édouard Roger-Vasselin
  Mathilde Johansson /  Adrian Mannarino
  Alizé Lim /  Jérémy Chardy
  Chloé Paquet /  Benoît Paire

Main draw qualifiers

Men's singles

Men's singles qualifiers
  Nikoloz Basilashvili
  Igor Sijsling
  Andrea Arnaboldi
  Elias Ymer
  Taro Daniel
  Luca Vanni
  Yoshihito Nishioka
  Christian Lindell
  Stéphane Robert
  Kimmer Coppejans
  Germain Gigounon
  Kyle Edmund
  Gastão Elias
  Matthias Bachinger
  Illya Marchenko
  Michael Berrer

Men's singles qualifiers – lucky losers

  Alejandro Falla
  Andrey Golubev
  Facundo Argüello

Women's singles

Women's singles qualifiers
  Teliana Pereira
  Verónica Cepede Royg
  Sesil Karatantcheva
  Olivia Rogowska
  Petra Martić
  Alexa Glatch
  Johanna Konta
  Dinah Pfizenmaier
  Lourdes Domínguez Lino
  Andrea Hlaváčková
  Margarita Gasparyan
  Paula Kania

Protected ranking
The following players were accepted directly into the main draw using a protected ranking:

Men's singles
  Florian Mayer (PR 34)
  Radek Štěpánek (PR 57)

Women's singles
  Bethanie Mattek-Sands (PR 52)

Champions

Seniors

Men's singles

  Stan Wawrinka def.  Novak Djokovic, 4–6, 6–4, 6–3, 6–4
It was Wawrinka's 2nd Grand Slam singles title, 10th career singles title and his 1st at the French Open.
Stan Wawrinka and Novak Djokovic got off to an even start at 3–3 in the first set, when Wawrinka's serve broke down, allowing Djokovic to win the set 6–4. In the second set, Wawrinka's form improved, and he eventually broke Djokovic on his fifth opportunity, which was set point, taking the set 6–4. Although Wawrinka earned three break points on Djokovic's first service game in the third set, at 1–0, Djokovic saved them all and held serve. However, Wawrinka broke serve four games later, firing "a brilliant forehand winner" and "an equally breathtaking backhand" to earn three break points and converting the first, and went on to take the set 6–3. In the fourth set, Djokovic quickly broke Wawrinka's serve and took a 3–0 lead, but Wawrinka broke back to level the set. When Wawrinka pressed on Djokovic's serve to earn two break points at 3–3, Djokovic rebounded with a succession of points to win the game and threaten Wawrinka's own serve at 0–40. Wawrinka then mounted his own comeback to hold serve before breaking Djokovic in the next game for a 5–4 lead. After earning a championship point at 40–30, Wawrinka fired a serve that appeared as though it may have been an ace, but the chair umpire checked the mark and confirmed that the ball was out. Djokovic rallied to earn a break point, but Wawrinka held his nerve and reeled off three points in a row to claim the fourth set and match.

Women's singles

  Serena Williams def.  Lucie Šafářová, 6–3, 6–7(2–7), 6–2
It was Williams's 20th Grand Slam singles title, her 3rd singles title of the year and 3rd at the French Open.
Serena Williams and Lucie Šafářová contested the finals of the women's singles championship. Williams won the first set 6–3 over Šafářová and started strong in the second set, going up 4–1 and appearing to be cruising toward her 20th major title. However, Šafářová fought back to even the set and take it into a tiebreaker, which she won easily. Momentum on her side, Šafářová won the first two games of the third set, but Williams managed to break her serve with a "heavy return". Williams did not allow Šafářová a single game for the remainder of the deciding set, winning it with the seventh break of the match.

Men's doubles

  Ivan Dodig /  Marcelo Melo def.  Bob Bryan /  Mike Bryan, 6–7(5–7), 7–6(7–5), 7–5
It was Dodig and Marcelo's 1st Grand Slam doubles titles.

Women's doubles

  Bethanie Mattek-Sands /  Lucie Šafářová def.  Casey Dellacqua /  Yaroslava Shvedova, 3–6, 6–4, 6–2
It was Mattek-Sands and Šafářová's 2nd Grand Slam doubles titles.

Mixed doubles

  Bethanie Mattek-Sands /  Mike Bryan def.  Lucie Hradecká /  Marcin Matkowski, 7–6(7–3), 6–1
It was Mattek-Sands' 2nd Grand Slam mixed doubles title and her 1st at the French Open.
It was Bryan's 4th Grand Slam mixed doubles title and his 2nd at the French Open.

Juniors

Boys' singles

  Tommy Paul def.  Taylor Harry Fritz, 7–6(7–4), 2–6, 6–2

Girls' singles

  Paula Badosa Gibert def.  Anna Kalinskaya, 6–3, 6–3

Boys' doubles

  Álvaro López San Martín /  Jaume Munar def.  William Blumberg /  Tommy Paul, 6–4, 6–2

Girls' doubles

  Miriam Kolodziejová /  Markéta Vondroušová def.  Caroline Dolehide /  Katerina Stewart, 6–0, 6–3

Wheelchair events

Wheelchair men's singles

  Shingo Kunieda def.  Stéphane Houdet, 6–1, 6–0

Wheelchair women's singles

  Jiske Griffioen def.  Aniek van Koot, 6–0, 6–2

Wheelchair men's doubles

  Shingo Kunieda /  Gordon Reid def.  Gustavo Fernández /  Nicolas Peifer, 6–1, 7–6(7–1)

Wheelchair women's doubles

  Jiske Griffioen /  Aniek van Koot def.  Yui Kamiji /  Jordanne Whiley, 7–6(7–1), 3–6, [10–8]

Other events

Legends under 45 doubles

  Juan Carlos Ferrero /  Carlos Moyá def.  Arnaud Clément /  Nicolas Escudé, 6–3, 6–3

Legends over 45 doubles

  Guy Forget /  Henri Leconte def.  Cédric Pioline /  Mark Woodforde, 4–6, 7–6(7–5), [10–3]

Women's legends doubles

  Kim Clijsters /  Martina Navratilova def.  Lindsay Davenport /  Mary Joe Fernández, 2–6, 6–2, [11–9]

Withdrawals
The following players were accepted directly into the main tournament but withdrew.
Before the tournament

 Men's singles
  Julien Benneteau → replaced by  Alejandro Falla
  Juan Martín del Potro → replaced by  Andrey Kuznetsov
  Tommy Haas → replaced by  Nicolás Almagro
  Milos Raonic → replaced by  Andrey Golubev
  Janko Tipsarević → replaced by  Facundo Argüello

 Women's singles
  Dominika Cibulková → replaced by  Misaki Doi
  Kateryna Kozlova → replaced by  Danka Kovinić
  Laura Robson → replaced by  Donna Vekić

During the tournament
Men's singles
  Benjamin Becker
  Kyle Edmund

Retirements

 Men's singles
  Mikhail Youzhny

 Women's singles
  Daria Gavrilova
  Peng Shuai
  Virginie Razzano

References

External links

 Roland Garros